A date shake is a milkshake made with dates. The drink originated in, and is particularly associated with, the Coachella Valley in California.

Preparation
A date shake is typically made with a base of milk or ice cream and blended; a shake can contain about 1/2 cup of dates.

Another method, invented in 1936 by Shield's Date Garden, involves the use of date crystals, dried "nubbins" of dates that are sweetened with date sugar. The crystals are then mixed with water to create a paste before being blended with other ingredients. An alternative method involves baking the dates, which are then blended to a paste-like consistency.

Date shakes are high in fiber, iron, potassium, and niacin. They have a high sugar and calorific content.

History 
At the end of the 19th century into the beginning of the 20th, plant explorers from the USDA were sent to search globally for new crops that could be farmed in North America. These explorers returned with date palms from North Africa and the Middle East. The explorer, Walter Swingle brought back six medjool date offshoots from a Moroccan oasis; these six offshoot specimens "account for all the megool dates grown in the US."  

In 1928, Russ Nicholl (sometimes spelled Nichol) and his family built a roadside shack near Thermal, California. Another news source states that Nichol built his shack in 1919. A few years later, this shack was expanded and named Valerie Jean after Nicholl's daughter. With electricity and refrigeration, the Nicholls were able to offer variations of ingredients blended with their supply of dates. Nichol was reportedly inspired by stories of nomads in the Middle East who he heard "lived entirely on dates and goat’s milk".

In 1924 Floyd and Bess Shields opened the Shields Date Garden in Indio to compete with the quickly growing date industry in Coachella Valley.

The Coachella Valley has numerous date shake shops, many of them are located on Highway 111. The small desert town of Westmoreland, where medjool dates are grown, and Indio, where Shields is located, are known for their date shakes. The drink has been called the "unofficial drink of the Coachella Valley" or the "unofficial drink of Palm Springs."

They are a popular drink at the Riverside County Fair and National Date Festival and during the Coachella Valley Music and Arts Festival.

References

External links

 

American drinks
Cuisine of the Western United States
California culture
Date dishes
Frozen drinks
Coachella Valley
Indio, California